The 7th Alberta Legislative Assembly was in session from January 29, 1931, to July 22, 1935, with the membership of the assembly determined by the results of the 1930 Alberta general election held on June 19, 1930. The Legislature officially resumed on January 29, 1931, and continued until the fifth session was prorogued on April 23, 1935 and dissolved on July 22, 1935, prior to the 1935 Alberta general election.

Alberta's sixth government was controlled by the majority United Farmers of Alberta for the third consecutive term, led by Premier John Edward Brownlee, who would later resign and be replaced with Richard Gavin Reid. There was no Official Opposition in Alberta between 1926 and 1941 due to the Independent Movement which saw a majority of non-UFA candidates elected as independents. The Speaker was George Norman Johnston.

Scandals

Premier John Brownlee's personal reputation was destroyed by a sex scandal in which he was successfully sued for the ancient and rarely litigated civil tort of seduction by a young woman in his employ.

In July 1933 Brownlee gave a car ride to Vivian MacMillan, then employed as a clerk in the office of the attorney general.  MacMillan's fiancé filed a seduction suit against Brownlee, who denied all charges and launched a countersuit alleging that MacMillan, her father, and her fiancé had planned the entire affair for their own financial gain.

The jury found Brownlee guilty of seduction, but the presiding judge overturned its verdict.  Nevertheless, the circumstances were damaging enough that Brownlee resigned from the provincial ministry in July 1934.

Little Bow MLA Oran McPherson also had a high-profile divorce scandal that made big headlines after Cora McPherson took him to court.

The UFA's economic policies as well as the scandalizing of Alberta's conservative population led to the party's downfall in the 1935 election when it failed to win one seat in the legislature.  William Aberhart and his Social Credit Party swept the province.

Bills

Alberta Provincial Police
On February 25, 1932, Justice Minister John F. Lymburn introduced An Act to ratify a certain Agreement between the Government of the Dominion of Canada and the Government of the Province of Alberta for Policing the Province (Bill 42) and An Act to Amend the Provincial Police Act, 1928 (Bill 43) which would wind-down the operations of the Alberta Provincial Police. Bill 42 ratifying the agreement passed on March 7, 1932 by a vote of 50-7, while Bill 43 would be passed two weeks later on March 21, 1932. Finally, on April 1, 1932 the Royal Canadian Mounted Police began policing operations in Alberta.

Alberta Health Insurance Act

The Alberta Health Insurance Act, passed by the Alberta Legislature in February 1935 was the first legislated health insurance program in Canada to provide some public funding for medical services, and as such is considered to be an early step toward the provision of medicare in Canada.

The legislation proposed to provide health care to the every province resident at an annual cost of CA$14.50 per person. However, the Act was unable to pass before the United Farmers of Alberta was defeated out of office by the Social Credit Party. The plan would require health care providers to provide specific services for the insured at no extra cost. These services included "full-time public health service", "complete medical service" (including major and minor surgery and obstetrics), "drugs and surgical appliances" if prescribed, limited "dental service", "private nursing service" (under special circumstances) and "hospitalization" (x-rays, operating room, lab services, etc.). Although this plan was not enacted, later in the 1940s and 1950s, a national health care system became gradually more prevalent among provinces. Hospital insurance would provide federal funds to provinces that would implement a universal hospital insurance plan. The full implementation of such programs slowly developed and in 1969 Alberta adopted a universal health insurance program.

Floor crossings
A sensational week occurred in the Assembly just prior to the opening of the 4th Legislative Session. Victoria MLA Peter Miskew decided to cross the floor from the United Farmers to the Liberals. The floor crossing did terrific damage to John Brownlee's government as the Premier had announced three days prior that Miskew would be moving the governments reply to the throne speech.

Miskew's reasoned after crossing the floor that moving the reply to the speech from the throne would mean that he would support the government's policies which he no longer believed in. He sent notice by memo to the premier deciding not to inform him in person.

Three days later, St. Albert MLA Omer St. Germain crossed the floor to join Miskew in the Liberal benches. David Duggan, the leader of the Conservatives, applauded Miskew crossing the floor. He stated that it was the beginning of the end for the United Farmers and that the conservative-minded elements in the United Farmers will oppose the radical elements that were allowing the Co-operative Commonwealth Federation to pull the United Farmers to the left.

Membership in the 7th Alberta Legislature

Standings changes since the 7th general election

References

Bibliography

Further reading

External links
Alberta Legislative Assembly
Legislative Assembly of Alberta Members Book
By-elections 1905 to present

07th Alberta Legislative Assembly